John Marcus Baddeley (20 November 1881 – 1 July 1953) was an Australian politician and member of the New South Wales Legislative Assembly from 25 March 1922 to 8 September 1949.

Early life
Baddeley was born in Burslem, Staffordshire, England and migrated to Australia with his family at the age of two. He was educated at Merewether public school, but left at eleven to do odd jobs in the Glebe colliery near Merewether and then worked as a coal miner. in 1902 he married Harriet Churchill and they went on to have two sons and three daughters. He moved to Cessnock in 1908 to work at Neath Colliery and later at Aberdare Extended Colliery. He became a cricketer, first-grade footballer and militant socialist trade union leader. He was a councillor of Cessnock Shire from January until October 1914 and was the first president of the Australian Coal and Shale Employees' Federation from 1915 until 1922.

Political career
Baddeley was the Labor Party member for Newcastle from 1922 to 1927 and member for Cessnock from 1927 until 1949. He was Secretary for Mines and Minister for Labour and Industry in the first (June 1925 to October 1927) and second Lang governments (November 1930 to May 1932). He supported Lang during the Labor factionalism of the 1930s, but he supported McKell's election as leader in 1939.

He was Deputy Premier, Colonial Secretary and Secretary for Mines in the McKell and McGirr governments from May 1941 until his retirement in September 1947, Minister for National Emergency Services from June 1944 to his retirement and Minister for Labour and Industry and Social Welfare from October 1947 to March 1948. Fauna As a keen student of natural history, he is also credited as the instigator of the Fauna Protection Act 1948 (NSW). He was acting Premier from August to December 1948, when he had a heart attack.

Baddeley was chairman of State Coal Mine Authority from his retirement until his death of cerebrovascular disease at St Luke's Hospital in the Sydney suburb of Darlinghurst, survived by his wife, two sons and three daughters.

References

 

 

 

 

 

 

Australian Labor Party members of the Parliament of New South Wales
Australian trade unionists
Deputy Premiers of New South Wales
English emigrants to Australia
Members of the New South Wales Legislative Assembly
New South Wales local councillors
People from Burslem
1881 births
1953 deaths
20th-century Australian politicians